Badimaya (sometimes written Badimia) is an Australian Aboriginal language. It is a member of the Kartu subgroup of the Pama–Nyungan family, spoken by the Badimaya people of the Mid West region of Western Australia.

Badimaya is a critically endangered language, spoken by only a handful of elderly Aboriginal people, all of whom are over 65 years of age. However, there is a passionate movement of language revival underway in the Badimaya community.

Geographic distribution 
Badimaya was traditionally spoken across a large region spanning Lake Moore, Ninghan Station, Paynes Find and Dalwallinu in the south, to Mount Magnet, Wynyangoo Station and Kirkalocka Station in the north.

Today Badimaya people live across the Mid West region, based in regional towns and communities including Mount Magnet, Geraldton, Yalgoo, Mullewa, Meekatharra, Wubin, Dalwallinu and Perth.

Traditional Badimaya country is bordered by Western Desert language (Tjuparn, Wanmala) to the east, Noongar to the south-west and Wajarri to the north-west.

Varieties 
Analysis of the lexicon and grammatical features of the language suggests that there were (at least) two varieties of Badimaya, a northern and southern variety. These varieties are unnamed; however, Badimaya speakers are aware of differences in the speech of Badimaya people from different regions of Badimaya country.

Widi, also referred to as Wiri (not to be confused with the Wiri language of Queensland) and a variety of other names, may be a dialect of Badimaya, but its status is unclear.

Typology 
Badimaya is typologically fairly standard of Western Australian Pama-Nyungan languages. It has a phoneme inventory typical of Pama-Nyungan languages, with six places of articulation (showing both a laminal and apical contrast) and a three-way vowel system, with (limited) length-contrast.

Badimaya is a suffixing language with fairly free word order. It has a split-ergative case marking system, consistent with neighbouring languages. Unlike neighbouring languages however, Badimaya does not show evidence for a bound pronominal system.

Phonology

Consonants 

The stops /b/, /g/, /dh/, /dy/, /d/, /rd/ are usually voiced initially and medially, but are voiceless in word final position. In areas further to the south, some speakers were recorded as not voicing any stops at all. In the northern dialect of Badimaya, it is common that word-initial plosives are unvoiced.

The laminal stops /dh/ and /dy/ are very frequently realised intervocalically as fricatives, [ð̪͆] and [ʑ] respectively (or [θ̪͆ ] and [ɕ] respectively if unvoiced). The degree of retroflexion for /rd/, /rn/, and /rl/ differs depending on the preceding vowel, being most extreme following /a/. The alveolar rhotic flap /rr/ is often difficult to distinguish from the alveolar plosive /d/ in regular speech, but the two may be distinguished by their positions in words: /d/ may appear initially, intervocalically, or finally, but /rr/ (as with /r/) only appears intervocalically.

One of the most noticeable phonological features of the data recorded of Badimaya is the consistent use of the retroflex approximant [ɻ] where, in identical lexical items of neighbouring Pama-Nyungan languages, the alveolar flap [ɾ] is used. It is not known whether this feature is idiosyncratic to Badimaya, or whether it is a case of phonological change due to language death. This is also the case with the modern tendency to realise the palatal plosive /dy/ as an affricate.

Unlike in many neighbouring languages, there is evidence for a dental/palatal contrast in Badimaya. On the basis of data collected, there is no evidence to suggest any patterns of complementary distribution between dental and palatal laminals in relation to front and back vowels, as is the case in Pitjantjatjara. There is also no evidence in the data to suggest neutralisation of the laminal contrast word-initially due to the presence of a laminal later in the word, as is the case in Diyari.

Vowels 

The high front vowel /i/ is realised [i] in every position except word-initially, where it is realised as [ɪ]. The high back vowel /u/ is expressed typically as [ʊ] in non-final position, particularly after peripheral consonants, and is realised elsewhere as [u]. It is reduced to [ə] following primary stress, and when adjacent to a liquid or nasal. The low vowel /a/, [a] by default, experiences the most allophonic variation: after a palatal consonant it is raised to an [ɛ]. Like /u/, it is reduced to [ə] when following primary stress, and when adjacent to a liquid or nasal. Word-finally, except after palatals, it is rendered [ʌ] - however, in place names ending with "-wa" (e.g. Mullewa), it is [ɔ]. It is also rendered [ʌ] in secondary stress. Following /w/ and preceding sonorants, /a/ is rendered [ɒ].

Restrictions on phoneme positions

The vowels /u/ and /a/ do not appear word-initially. The high front vowel /i/ is the only vowel found word-initially, but this can also be analysed as a reduction of /yi/, with an initial consonant.

Constraints on the distribution of consonants are as follows:
 Every Badimaya consonant can appear intervocalically.
 Only peripheral and laminal consonants, with the exclusion of laterals, can appear word-initially. Of the word-initial laminals, the majority are palatal.
 Only nasals, laterals, the stops /d/ and /g/, and the alveolar tap or trill /rr/ can appear word-finally.

The above rules are identical to how they were recorded by Leone Dunn (1988), except for the appearance of /rr/ word-finally, which Dunn did not observe, and may have misidentified when it did occur.

There are two instances of the alveolar lateral /l/ appearing word-initially:
Douglas (1981) lists the word "likarra" as a Badimaya loanword in his collection of Wajarri terms. This would appear to contradict the Badimaya rule of laterals not appearing word-initially; however, it is also listed as being of Western Desert language origin, and the word (identical phonetically and seemingly semantically) does appear in the language. Thus, this exception can be discounted on the basis of being a loanword from the a Western Desert dialect.
The word "lun.gi" shows an /l/ word-initially, and does not appear to be a loanword.

Grammar

Pronominal system 
Pronouns are of the form: person+number+case. The third person displays person allomorphy conditioned by number. There are morphological distinctions in the first and second person for the dual number, but this distinction is not found in the third person in the southern dialect. The pronominal forms of the southern dialect of Badimaya are listed below: 

There are two demonstrative pronouns a proximal (nhinha) and a distal (banha) which are declined as follows. The ablative case is formed by adding a suffix to both the ablative ending (-ngun) and the word gardi 'side.'

There are four interrogative proforms, the nominal referring of which have case paradigms for the absolutive, ergative, locative and dative cases. The dative case has a possessive function.

Language resources 
The Bundiyarra Irra Wangga Language Centre (and previously the Yamaji Language Centre) has been carrying out work on the Badimaya language since 1993. A sketch grammar of Badimaya was published by Leone Dunn in 1988, and a Badimaya-English dictionary (2014), illustrated topical dictionary (2014) and several children's books were published by Bundiyarra Irra Wangga Language Centre. The last fluent speaker of Badimaya, Mt Magnet elder Ollie George, undertook significant language documentation work between the early 1990s and 2018, in collaboration with Bundiyarra Irra Wangga Language Centre.

An art and language project, Nganang Badimaya Wangga, was collaboratively produced in 2017 by the Irra Wangga Language Centre, with artists from Yamaji Art and Wirnda Barna Artists. The project produced a book of more than 20 stories of Ollie's life entitled Nganang Badimaya Wangga: Yarns with Gami Ollie George, a short video about Ollie by ABC Open Producer Chris Lewis, and an exhibition of the artworks created for the project.

Notes

References

 Bednall, James (compiler). 2014. 'Badimaya Dictionary: an Aboriginal language of Western Australian'. Bundiyarra Irra Wangga Language Centre, Geraldton WA.
 Dunn, Leone. 1988. 'Badimaya, a Western Australian language' pp. 19–49 in Papers in Australian Linguistics No. 17, Pacific Linguistics, Canberra.

External links
 Bibliography of Badimaya language and people resources, at the Australian Institute of Aboriginal and Torres Strait Islander Studies

Kartu languages
Endangered indigenous Australian languages in Western Australia
Mid West (Western Australia)